Sir Asher Alexander Joel  (4 May 1912 – 12 November 1998) was an Australian public figure and a member of the New South Wales Legislative Council for 20 years. Although he was Jewish, he received a papal knighthood in 1994.

Career
In the 1930s he worked in journalism and public relations.

During World War II, he enlisted in the Second Australian Imperial Force in 1942, then transferred to the Royal Australian Navy, joining the staff of General Douglas MacArthur between 1944 and 1945. He was discharged with the rank of lieutenant on 17 August 1945.

In 1946 he founded Asher Joel Pty Ltd, a public relations firm. He was instrumental in the 1949 founding of the Public Relations Institute of Australia.

In 1958, Joel was elected to the New South Wales Legislative Council as an Independent, but joined the then Country Party (now the National Party) the following year. In 1971–1972, he served as party treasurer, and in 1971, he served on the central executive. He retired from the Legislative Council in 1978.

In 1975, he established the Sir Asher Joel Foundation to assist Macquarie University students to participate on archaeological digs with Tel Aviv University.

During the course of his career, he helped to organise a number of large-scale events, acting in an honorary capacity:

 the visit of Princess Alexandra of Kent in 1956
 the visit of U.S. President Lyndon B. Johnson in 1966
 the visit of Pope Paul VI in 1970.

He was also heavily involved with the establishment of the Sydney Opera House.

He was also a member of NAJEX (NSW Association of Jewish Service & Ex-Service Men & Women); is one of the oldest Jewish organisations in Australia.

Death
At Joel's funeral in 1998, Rabbi Raymond Apple of the Great Synagogue, Sydney, described Joel as an "Australian legend", having "walked with kings, queens, princes of the Church... with a genuine aristocracy of personality and presence. He had elegance, style and bearing, but humanity too."

Joel was survived by his wife Sybil (née Jacobs), children Richard, David, Michael, Alexandra and grandchildren Natasha, Phoebe, Bennett, Alina, Arabella and Nicholas.

Honours
The honours Joel received included:
 U.S. Bronze Star Medal, 1945
 Officer of the Order of the British Empire (OBE), 1956
 Knight Bachelor, 1971
 Knight Commander of the Order of the British Empire (KBE), 1974
 Maginoo (Officer) of the Ancient Order of Sikatuna, Philippines, 1975
 Torch of Learning Award of the Hebrew University of Jerusalem, 1978
 Knight Commander of Rizal, Philippines, 1978
 Officer of the Order of Australia (AO), 1986
 Citation of Honour, New South Wales Jewish Board of Deputies, 1992
 Knight of the Order of St. Sylvester (papal knighthood), 1994
 Certificate of Honour from the Hebrew University of Jerusalem

Books
Australian Protocol and Procedures, 1982
Without Chains, Free, 1977

References

1912 births
1998 deaths
Australian Army soldiers
Australian Knights Commander of the Order of the British Empire
Australian politicians awarded knighthoods
Independent members of the Parliament of New South Wales
Jewish Australian politicians
Knights of the Order of St. Sylvester
Members of the New South Wales Legislative Council
National Party of Australia members of the Parliament of New South Wales
Officers of the Order of Australia
Royal Australian Navy officers
Royal Australian Navy personnel of World War II
20th-century Australian politicians
20th-century Australian businesspeople
Australian Army personnel of World War II